Threats is a 1996 role-playing game supplement for Shadowrun published by FASA.

Contents
Threats is a sourcebook presenting conspiracy theories about 14 dangerous organizations and entities.

Reception
Andy Butcher reviewed Threats for Arcane magazine, rating it a 7 out of 10 overall. Butcher comments that "As well as offering alternatives to the traditional corporate bad guys, the book expands Shadowrun's scope. Referees may not find themselves directly using a great deal of the material presented here, but they will certainly find a lot of inspiration for their games."

References

Role-playing game supplements introduced in 1996
Shadowrun supplements